Michael Cummins may refer to:

 Micky Cummins (born 1978), Irish footballer
 Michael Cummins (serjeant-at-arms) (1939–2020), Serjeant-at-Arms of the British House of Commons